Jao Nang, also known as The Princess's Terror, is a period horror Lakorn which originally aired in the mid-1990s and became known among Thai viewers as the most frightening lakorn.  It starred Chakkrit Amarat (จักรกฤษณ์ อำมรัตน์) and Kavinna Suvannaprateep (กวินนา สุวรรณประทีป) in the leading roles.

In 1997, BBTV Channel 7 released its hit lakorn, Pob Pee Fa, which provided a plot similar to this lakorn, but with different characters and story details.  This 1997 lakorn was later referred to as a remake by some viewers.

The real identity of Pee Fah is Phi Pop (ผีปอบ), a ghost of popular Thai folklore.

Plot
A princess of the northeast kingdom, suddenly possessed by the spirit of an ogress, turns to an evil spirit to find the raw food and fresh blood that must be provided in a banana leaf for a sick spirit.  This has occurred over the centuries, with several generations of princesses in terror.

Reception
The lakorn received an extremely high rating among Thai viewers and was one of the highest rated lakorn for Channel 5. Thai viewers recently rated it as one of the scariest lakorn ever.

References

External links
Watch the opening credit

Thai television soap operas
Channel 5 (Thailand) original programming
1990 Thai television series debuts
1990 Thai television series endings
1990s Thai television series